Dallgow-Döberitz is a municipality in the Havelland district, in Brandenburg, Germany.

Geography 
It consists of the villages of Dallgow-Döberitz, Rohrbeck and Seeburg. To the east it shares border with the Spandau borough of Berlin. Neighbouring Brandenburg municipalities are Falkensee in the north and Wustermark in the west. In the south is the large former proving ground Döberitzer Heide, now mainly a nature reserve governed by the Heinz Sielmann Foundation.

Districts of Dallgow-Döberitz 
 Dallgow (with Neu-Döberitz)
 Rohrbeck
 Seeburg

History 
The Imperial German Army established a proving ground in 1894 around the village of Döberitz, which had to be abandoned by its inhabitants. Its pioneering airfield was, in late 1915, the place where the world's first practical all-metal aircraft, the Junkers J 1, made its pioneering flights.

During the 1936 Summer Olympics in neighboring Berlin, it hosted the riding part of the modern pentathlon and part of the equestrian eventing competitions.

Between 1945 and 1951 Dallgow served as East German border crossing for cars travelling along F 5 between the Soviet Zone of occupation in Germany (till 1949, thereafter the East German Democratic Republic) or the British Zone of Occupation (till 1949) and thereafter the West German Federal Republic of Germany and West Berlin. The traffic was subject to the Interzonal traffic regulations. After the East German Volkspolizei took control of West-Staaken on 1 February 1951 the checkpoint was moved eastwards.

The municipality shared its borders with the former West Berlin, and so during the period 1961-1990 it was separated from it by the Berlin Wall.

The 2008 film The Wave was filmed at the Marie Curie Gymnasium in this municipality.

Demography

References

External links 
 Heinz Sielmann Stiftung  - Döberitzer Heide nature reserve (in German)

Venues of the 1936 Summer Olympics
Olympic equestrian venues
Olympic modern pentathlon venues
Localities in Havelland